The 1989 Australian Drivers' Championship was an Australian motor racing competition open to racing cars complying with CAMS Formula Holden regulations. The championship winner was awarded the 1989 CAMS Gold Star as the Australian Drivers' Champion. It was the 33rd running of the Australian Drivers' Championship and the first to feature the Formula Holden class which had been developed during 1988, originally named Formula Australia.

The championship began on 7 May 1989 at Mallala Motor Sport Park and ended on 10 September at Sandown Raceway after ten rounds. Defending champion Rohan Onslow of Sydney won his second consecutive CAMS Gold Star driving a Ralt RT20. Mark McLaughlin placed second in his Elfin FA891 with Channel 7 television commentator Neil Crompton finishing third in his debut year in open wheel racing driving a Ralt RT20.

Teams and drivers
The following teams and drivers competed in the 1989 Australian Drivers' Championship. 

Note: All cars were required by the Formula Holden regulations to be fitted with 3.8 litre Holden V6 engines.

Race calendar
The 1989 Australian Drivers' Championship was contested over ten rounds at five race meetings.

Points system 
Championship points were awarded 9–6–4–3–2–1 based on the top six race positions at each round.

Results

References

Further reading

External links
 Australian Drivers’ Championship – CAMS Gold Star, motorsport.org.au, as archived at web.archive.org
 Images from the championship at raidermotorsport.com.au

Australian Drivers' Championship
Drivers' Championship
Formula Holden